"Happy Thoughts" is a song by Swedish singers Benjamin Ingrosso and Felix Sandman, released as a single on 10 May 2019 through TEN Music Group and Artist House. It is their second collaboration, following the release of "Tror du att han bryr sig" in May 2018. A music video co-directed by the pair with Robin Kadir was released for the track on 12 May 2019. "Happy Thoughts" was certified gold in Sweden in August 2019.

Background
Ingrosso said the pair wrote the song about both of their exes when they were both going through "the stage you hear in the song". He also called it a "more chill" pop song and "completely different" to his and Sandman's previous collaboration "Tror du att han bryr sig".

Critical reception
Anders Nunstedt of Expressen said the song begins as if it were "entirely Ingrosso's. But when Sandman steps into the electronically soulful sound image, something happens." Nunstedt complimented the duo's chemistry and said they should "come up with a band name for their side project" and take their production "further".

Charts

References

2019 singles
2019 songs
Benjamin Ingrosso songs
English-language Swedish songs
Felix Sandman songs
Songs written by Benjamin Ingrosso
Songs written by Felix Sandman
Male vocal duets